Peter Black may refer to:

Peter Black (Australian politician) (born 1943), member of the New South Wales Legislative Assembly
Peter Black (Welsh politician) (born 1960), member of the Welsh Assembly
Peter Black (musician), recording artist on Hidden Beach Records